Thevetia ahouai is a species of flowering plant in the family Apocynaceae, native to Mexico, Central America, Cuba, Colombia, and Venezuela, and introduced to southeastern China. An evergreen shrub or small tree of forests reaching , it is used as a street tree in Nicaragua and Colombia.

References

Rauvolfioideae
Flora of Mexico
Flora of Central America
Flora of Cuba
Flora of Colombia
Flora of Venezuela
Plants described in 1813